The following is a list of notable deaths in June 1991.

Entries for each day are listed alphabetically by surname. A typical entry lists information in the following sequence:
 Name, age, country of citizenship at birth, subsequent country of citizenship (if applicable), reason for notability, cause of death (if known), and reference.

June 1991

1
Gordon Jackson, 67, Australian businessman.
David Ruffin, 50, American singer (The Temptations), crack cocaine overdose.
Árpád Soós, 78, Hungarian zoologist, entomologist and museologist.
Toshio Usami, 83, Japanese field hockey player.

2
Ahmed Arif, 64, Turkish-Kurdish poet, heart attack.
John Coughlan, 56, Australian politician.
Richard Meikle, 61, Australian actor.
Vincent Miceli, 76, American Catholic priest, theologian, and philosopher.
Robert Russell Newton, 72, American physicist, astronomer, and historian of science.
Joyce Treiman, 69, American painter.

3
Margit Anna, 77, Hungarian painter.
Brian Bevan, 66, Australian rugby player.
Vince Colletta, 67, American comic book artist (Fantastic Four, Thor, Wonder Woman).
Raffaele Costantino, 83, Italian footballer.
Harry Glicken, 33, American volcanologist, pyroclastic flow.
Katia Krafft, 49, French volcanologist, pyroclastic flow.
Maurice Krafft, 45, French volcanologist, pyroclastic flow.
Dinesh Goswami, 56, Indian politician.
Osmo Kaila, 75, Finnish chess master.
Eva Le Gallienne, 92, English-American actress.
Andy Milligan, 62, American playwright, AIDS.
Takeshi Nagata, 77, Japanese geophysicist.

4
Pentti Elo, 61, Finnish Olympic field hockey player (1952).
Adriaan Katte, 90, Dutch Olympic field hockey player (1928).
Franz Schafranek, 61, Austrian theatre director.
MC Trouble, 20, American rap artist, heart failure.
Rudolf Vogel, 85, German politician and member of the Bundestag.

5
Rosalina Abejo, 68, Filipino composer.
Evelyn Boucher, 99, British film actress.
Min Chueh Chang, 82, Chinese-American biologist.
Carl-Erik Holmberg, 84, Swedish football player.
Ho Jong-suk, 88, Korean communist revolutionist, atheist, activist, journalist, and writer.
Barry Kelley, 82, American actor (Oklahoma!, The Manchurian Candidate, The Asphalt Jungle).
Larry Kert, 60, American actor (West Side Story), AIDS-related complications.
Jacques Mitterrand, 82, French politician and Grand Master.
Sylvia Porter, 77, American economist, journalist and author.
Arthur Trudeau, 88, American Army lieutenant general.

6
Gianni De Luca, 64, Italian comic book artist and visual artist.
Stan Getz, 64, American saxophonist ("The Girl from Ipanema"), liver cancer.
Adnan Süvari, 64-65, Turkish football coach, heart attack.
Kurt Treu, 62, German classical philologist.

7
Tahir Allauddin Al-Qadri Al-Gillani, 58, Iraqi-Pakistani Sufi philosopher.
Antoine Blondin, 69, French writer.
Sydney McMeekan, 66, British basketball player.
Haoui Montaug, 38-39, American nightclub bouncer and revue operator, suicide by overdose.

8
Mary Bacon, 43, American jockey and model, suicide.
Heidi Brühl, 49, German singer and actress, breast cancer.
Pierrette Caillol, 92, French stage and film actress.
Monroe D. Donsker, 66, American mathematician, cancer.
Maurice Huet, 72, French fencer.
Bimal Krishna Matilal, 56, British-Indian philosopher.
Bertice Reading, 57, American-English actress, stroke.
David Allan Young, 76, American entomologist.
Wilhelm Szewczyk, 75, Polish writer, poet, communist activist, and politician.

9
Claudio Arrau, 88, Chilean pianist, complications from surgery.
Joe Hamilton, 62, American television producer and actor, cancer.
Howard Hobson, 87, American basketball player and coach.
J. Raymond Jones, 91, American politician.
Raj Khosla, 66, Indian filmmaker.
Charles Loloma, 70, American artist and jeweler.

10
Jean Bruller, 89, French novelist.
Jim Burrows, 86, New Zealand rugby player and soldier.
Tormod Mobraaten, 81, Norwegian-Canadian Olympic skier (1936, 1948).
Irvine Page, 90, American physiologist.
Jack Purcell, 87, Canadian world champion badminton player.
Silvan Tomkins, 80, American psychologist.

11
David Croll, 91, Canadian politician.
Cromwell Everson, 65, South African composer.
George Henry Guilfoyle, 77, American prelate of the Roman Catholic Church.
Friedl Hardt, 72, German actress.
Goldie Holt, 89, American baseball player, scout, coach and manager.
Bert Reisfeld, 84, Austrian  lyricist.
Carl Ring, 89, American hurdler and Olympian.
Moe Spahn, 79, American basketball player, heart failure.
Wolfgang Stegmüller, 68, German-Austrian philosopher.
John Vallier, 70, English pianist, lung cancer.
Michael Wall, 44, British playwright.

12
Iwao Ageishi, 83, Japanese Olympic skier (1932).
Alexander Baring, 6th Baron Ashburton, 93, British businessman and politician.
Reg Hamilton, 77, Canadian ice hockey player and coach.
Branko Hofman, 61, Slovene poet, writer and playwright.
Alfred Pasquali, 92, French actor and theatre director.
Eric Smith, 56, Scottish football player.

13
Ubaldesco Baldi, 46, Italian sport shooter and Olympic medalist.
Karl Bielig, 92, German politician and member of the Bundestag.
Loulou Boulaz, 83, Swiss mountain climber and alpine skier.
Gearóid Ó Cuinneagáin, 81, Irish language activist, nationalist and far-right politician.
John Jordan, 81, American basketball player and coach.
Marek Kuczma, 55, Polish mathematician.
John Schmitt, 89, American Olympic rower (1928).

14
Peggy Ashcroft, 83, English actress (A Passage to India ,The Nun's Story, Three into Two Won't Go), stroke.
Shiro Kasamatsu, 93, Japanese artist.
Lozan Kotsev, 80, Bulgarian football manager.
Bernard Miles, 83, English actor.
Vladimir Mikhaylovich Petrov, 84, Soviet diplomat and defector.
John Pilch, 65, American basketball player.
Frank Valentino, 84, American operatic baritone.

15
Abdullah Mubarak Al-Sabah, 76, Kuwaiti royal.
Happy Chandler, 92, American politician and baseball official, heart attack.
Wacław Król, 75, Polish Air Force pilot and officer.
Arthur Lewis, 76, Saint Lucian economist, Nobel Prize recipient (1979).
Virgil Rayburn, 80, American gridiron football player.
Les Selvage, 48, American basketball player.

16
Vicki Brown, 50, English singer, breast cancer.
Bruce Cummings, 64, Canadian football player, heart attack.
Emmanuel Laroche, 76, French linguist.
Adina Mandlová, 81, Czech film and stage actress, tuberculosis.

17
Mehmet Aziz, 97, Turkish Cypriot medical doctor.
Harry Darbyshire, 59, English footballer.
Pierre Jamet, 98, French harpist.
Beatrice Pons, 85, American actress.

18
Ronald Allen, 60, British actor (Crossroads, A Night to Remember, Doctor Who), cancer.
Joan Caulfield, 69, American actress, cancer.
Bill Douglas, 57, Scottish film director.
Leonida Frascarelli, 85, Italian racing cyclist.
Eric Halstead, 79, New Zealand politician.

19
Jean Arthur, 90, American actress (The More the Merrier, Mr. Smith Goes to Washington, Only Angels Have Wings), heart failure.
Larry Bogart, 77, American anti–nuclear power activist, traffic accident.
Åke Dahlqvist, 90, Swedish cinematographer.
Antonio del Amo, 79, Spanish screenwriter and film director, traffic collision.
Oskar Fredriksen, 82, Norwegian cross-country skier.

20
Roy Fournier, 69, Canadian politician.
Malcolm Frager, 56, American pianist.
Max Lüthi, 82, Swiss literary theorist.
Jock Nelson, 83, Australian politician.
Gerald Priestland, 64, British broadcaster.
Michael Westphal, 26, German tennis player, AIDS-related complications.
Isaac Wolfson, 93, Scottish businessman and philanthropist.

21
Julio Gallardo, 49, Chilean football player.
Jackie Hunt, 71, American gridiron football player.
Ivor Salter, 65, English actor.
Klaus Schwarzkopf, 68, German actor, AIDS.
Rudra Mohammad Shahidullah, 34, Bangladeshi poet, drug abuse and depression.
Toshihiro Shimamura, 79, Japanese Go player.

22
Luigi Infantino, 70, Italian operatic tenor.
Kevin O'Connor, 56, American actor.
Marv Owen, 85, American baseball player, manager, coach and scout.
Herbert Sohler, 82, German U-boat commander during World War II.

23
Cyril Aldred, 77, English historian.
Basdeo Bissoondoyal, 85, Mauritian educator and activist.
António Jacinto, 66, Angolan poet and politician.
Piero Lulli, 68, Italian film actor.
Lea Padovani, 70, Italian film actress.
Michael Pfleghar, 58, German film director and screenwriter, suicide.
Masayuki Takayanagi, 58, Japanese jazz musician.

24
Sumner Locke Elliott, 73, Australian-American novelist and playwright.
James Fawcett, 78, British barrister.
Nitty Gritty, 34, Jamaican reggae singer, shot.
Franz Hengsbach, 80, German Catholic cardinal and bishop.
Philip Rastelli, 73, American mobster and boss of the Bonanno crime family, liver cancer.
Rufino Tamayo, 91, Mexican painter, heart attack.

25
Colin Atkinson, 59, English cricket player and schoolmaster.
Hans Bernlöhr, 83, German boxer and Olympian.
Michael Heidelberger, 103, American immunologist.
Tauno Lindgren, 79, Finnish cyclist and Olympian.

26
Vlasta Fabianová, 78, Czechoslovak film actress.
Kunibert Gensichen, 84, German actor.
Domina Jalbert, 86, American aviator .
Johnny Johnson, 76, American baseball player.
Jack A. Marta, 88, American cinematographer.
Mike Masaoka, 76, Japanese-American lobbyist, author, and spokesman.
Iwa Wanja, 85, Bulgarian-German actress.
Öllegård Wellton, 59, Swedish actress.
Wolfgang Zilzer, 90, German actor.

27
Klaas Bruinsma, 37, Dutch drug lord, shot.
Molly Geertsema, 72, Dutch politician and jurist.
Cynthia Longfield, 95, Anglo-Irish entomologist and explorer.
George MacLeod, 96, Scottish presbyterian clergyman and soldier.
Milton Subotsky, 69, American screenwriter and producer.

28
Arnold Kieffer, 80, Luxembourgian football player.
Ernie McCormick, 85, Australian cricket player.
Hans Nüsslein, 81, German tennis player.
Nikolas Vogel, 24, Austrian actor and journalist, missile strike.
Norbert Werner, 23, Austrian journalist and war correspondent, missile strike.

29
Jim Connock, 66, English film editor.
Russ Hinze, 72, Australian politician.
Richard Holmes, 60, American organist, heart attack.
Henri Lefebvre, 90, French sociologist.
Enrique Cahen Salaberry, 79, Argentine film director.
Valerijonas Šadreika, 53, Lithuanian politician.

30
Berndt Carlsson, 84, Swedish cyclist and Olympian.
John B. Goodman, 89, American art director.
Tamara Khanum, 85, Soviet dancer.
Pamela Stanley, 81, British actress.
Hisao Tanaka, 70, American professional wrestler.

References 

1991-06
 06